Jhina Hikaka is a member of the Biju Janata Dal (BJD) political party. He is elected to the 16th Lok Sabha in 2014 from Koraput constituency in Odisha. He was a MLA from Laxmipur assembly constituency of Koraput district in Odisha. He was kidnapped by Maoists and kept in captivity for 33 days before being released unharmed on 26 April 2012.

See also
 Indian general election, 2014 (Odisha)

References

External links
 

Biju Janata Dal politicians
Members of the Odisha Legislative Assembly
Living people
Year of birth missing (living people)
Lok Sabha members from Odisha
India MPs 2014–2019
People from Koraput district